Padiham is a town and civil parish on the River Calder, about  west of Burnley, Lancashire, England. It forms part of the Borough of Burnley. Originally by the River Calder, it is edged by the foothills of Pendle Hill to the north-west and north-east. The United Kingdom Census 2011 gave a parish population of 10,098, estimated in 2019 at 10,138.

History
No prehistoric or Roman sites have been found in the built-up area. Padiham, though a name of Anglo-Saxon origin, is not recorded in the 1086 Domesday Book. The first record, as Padyngham, dates from 1294. It remained for centuries as a market town, where produce from Pendleside was bought and sold. The town expanded and was redeveloped during the Industrial Revolution. The centre is now a conservation area.

Padiham's population peaked around 1921 at about 14,000, declining to 10,000 in the early 1960s and 8,998 at the time of the 2001 census. This reflected how people were moving to the south of England in search of work, after the decline in the traditional cotton, coal and engineering manufacturing industries.

The Queen and Prince Philip first visited Burnley, Nelson and the old Mullard valve factory at Simonstone near Padiham on their post-Coronation tour of Lancashire in 1955.

Governance
Padiham, once a township in the parish of Whalley, became a civil parish in 1866. An urban district covered the town from 1894 until 1974, but over this time, some rural areas mainly to the north became a new civil parish, Northtown, as part of Burnley Rural District. The Padiham Green area, hitherto part of Hapton, joined Padiham, with another small area following in 1935. Since 1974 Padiham has formed part of the Borough of Burnley. Initially part of an unparished area, a new Padiham civil parish was formed in late 2001, covering a similar area to the old urban district. A Town Council was instituted in 2002. Further boundary changes in 2004 saw the parish gain more territory in the south from Hapton.

Councillors for Padiham on Burnley Borough Council are elected to the Gawthorpe Ward, which covers most of Padiham, but not Gawthorpe Hall, with southern and eastern areas covered by Hapton with Park Ward. Padiham comes under Lancashire County Council. The Parliamentary Constituency, Burnley, is currently represented by Antony Higginbotham for the Conservative Party.

Demography
According to the United Kingdom Census 2011, the parish had a population of 10,098, an increase from 8,998 in the 2001 census. The town forms part of a wider urban area, which had a population of 149,796 in 2001. A similar but larger, Burnley Built-up area defined in the 2011 census had a population of 149,422.

The racial composition of the town in 2011 was 98.1% White (96.6% White British), 1.1% Asian, 0.1% Black, 0.5% Mixed and 0.1% Other. The largest religious groups were Christian (70.0%) and Muslim (0.6%). 68.3% of adults between the ages of 16 and 74 were classed as economically active and in work.

Economy
In the 19th century, Padiham's industry was based on coal-mining and weaving. Helm Mill on Factory Lane was the first mill built in 1807. By 1906 there were twenty cotton mills though the best preserved, now converted into flats, is Victoria Mill in Ightenhill Street, built in 1852–1853 and extended in 1873. Many cotton workers belonged to the Padiham Weavers' Association, whose membership peaked in 1907 at over 6,000.

By 1848, Padiham had many coal pits around the town, including two large collieries and a number of smaller workings. Availability of coal and water nearby helped to boost the cotton industry. Industry benefited further from the arrival of the railway at Hapton in 1840 and Padiham itself in 1877. The last pit closed about 1870, although mining continued in areas outside the town into the 1950s, and open cast mining took place in the 1960s east of the town close to Gawthorpe Hall, north of the River Calder off Grove Lane.

Since the 1960s, the remaining cotton mills have continued a decline that began in the 1930s. So too has Padiham's role as a manufacturing base since the 1990s. The town's last major employer in the sector, Baxi, closed its factory in March 2007, with a loss of 500 jobs. A modern business park, Shuttleworth Mead, opened in 2001 on the western edge of the town where Padiham Power Station had stood until 1993. The business park has been supported by £2.2 million from the European Regional Development Fund and £2 million from the North West Development Agency. Tenants include Supanet, an internet service provider (ISP) and Graham & Brown, a wall coverings company.

In 2007 Fort Vale Engineering developed a new purpose-built factory, where the old Mullard/Philips site at Calder Vale Park, Simonstone had closed in 2004. Fort Vale Engineering employs some 280 local people and has brought business to other local employers.

Landmarks
There are five significant mansions in the local area: Huntroyde Hall, dating from 1576, and Simonstone Hall, dating from 1660, in nearby Simonstone, are still privately owned. Gawthorpe Hall was donated to the National Trust in 1970, but is jointly managed with Lancashire County Council under a 99-year lease. Gawthorpe is in the Ightenhill district. 
The National Trust also runs an office and a tearoom in the courtyard of the property. Gawthorpe was owned by the Shuttleworth family, which held Shuttleworth Hall near Hapton from the 12th century. The current building dates from 1639 and is still a working farm.

St Leonard's Parish Church dates from 1866 to 1869 and is a Grade II listed building. It occupies the site of earlier churches dating back to 1451 or earlier. The original churchyard did not extend so far north as it does today. In 1802 proposals were made to extend it and remove "nuisances" on the north side of the church. This occurred in 1835. It seems likely that the former premises of Padiham Grammar School were purchased and demolished at that time.

Padiham Town Hall in Burnley Road, built in 1938 to designs by Bradshaw Gass & Hope, is a Grade II listed building.

Padiham Memorial Park at the top of Church Street, was designed by Thomas Mawson, a prolific landscape designer. It was officially opened in 1921 as a memorial to those of the town who gave their lives in the First World War. It now commemorates victims of the Second World War as well.

The upper section is mainly formal, dominated by Knight Hill House, currently used as an Age UK (formerly Age Concern) day centre, and has a rose garden, lawns and two memorials. The lower section, off Park Street, has two bowling greens, tennis courts, skate park and Padiham Leisure Centre. The park is a Green Flag award winner. The park still had remains of some Second World War air raid shelters in 2008.

Another locally listed building is the former Padiham Building Society headquarters. A detached building over two storeys with large underground vault on Burnley Road, constructed between 1955-1958 and officially opened in 1959. The building was recently renovated by local businessman Liam Veitch and converted into individual office spaces.

Padiham War Memorial itself is at the main park entrance in Blackburn Road. There is a second memorial at All Saints' with St John the Baptist off the A671, Padiham Road, opposite the George IV pub. A local man, Thomas Clayton, funded the park in his will; public subscription provided additional money for the park's many features.

Near the war memorial, the Air Crash Memorial recalls several local young people killed on 3 July 1970. when a Dan Air de Havilland Comet deviated from its course and crashed into the high ground of the Montseny Range in north-eastern Spain – see: Dan-Air Flight 1903.

The aircraft, destroyed on impact and by subsequent ground fire, contained three flight crew, four cabin crew and 105 passengers, all of whom died. It was the airline's first fatal accident involving fare-paying passengers. The tour operator, Clarksons Holidays, was at the time Britain's largest package holiday company.

Several other buildings in the area are also of historic interest. Hargrove can be seen from a public footpath off the Padiham by-pass just north of the town and the 1950s council housing estate north of Windermere Road. For over 400 years it was the home of the Webster family of yeoman farmers. The house is probably 17th century and part of the Huntroyed estate. Coal from a local outcrop heated the house for many years. Stockbridge House in Victoria Road was occupied by the Holts, a farming family, in 1802 and has a Jacobean chimney. High Whitaker Farm is north-east of Hargrove, accessible by public footpath from Higham Road and from Grove Lane. The building is 16th century and said to have been used to hide Catholics during the reign of Henry VIII. Other houses of note are Priddy Bank Farm and Foulds House Farm, both off Sabden Road, and Arbory Lodge on Arbory Drive.

Transport

Rail
Padiham railway station was on a branch line (known as the Great Harwood loop) of the East Lancashire Line from Burnley to Blackburn. It opened in 1877, but was closed on 2 December 1957 and the station later demolished. The line was retained for deliveries of coal to Padiham Power Station until that closed in 1993. The old line was converted into a footpath/bridleway/cycleway called Padiham Greenway, completed in June 2010.

Buses
The town is served by Burnley Bus Company services from Accrington, Burnley, Nelson, Colne and beyond, and by a Blackburn Bus Company service 152 from Burnley, Blackburn and Preston.

Road
Junction 8 of the M65 also gives access to the A56 dual carriageway leading to the M66 and access to the Manchester motorway network.

Air
The nearest airport, Manchester, is 50 minutes' drive. The best route by public transport is via Blackburn, then train. It takes some 2¼ hours.

Historic maps
The 1845 map (1) shows the town of Padiham in the early days of the Lancashire cotton industry in Victorian times, with three mills marked. Most of the town at that stage was north of the river. The top left-hand corner shows part of the Huntroyde Demesne. The River Calder, on the right of the map, flows to the north, having been diverted in the early 19th century from its original route, away from Gawthorpe Hall (shown in pink), because of pollution. In the 1960s the river was re-routed to its original course to accommodate open-cast coal mining.

The 1890 Ordnance Survey map (2) shows the cotton-industry growth of the cotton industry in the later 19th century. The 1–25,000 scale OS map (3) is a partial extract from the two maps indicated. Several historic locations shown include Read Hall (A2) and Read (B2); Martholme, just east of Martholme Viaduct (A3); Simonstone and Simonstone Hall (C3); Huntroyd and grounds (D1–D2); Padiham Power Station (D3) with the connecting line for fuel; post-war housing north of the town off Slade Lane (E2); High Whitaker (F1); the River Calder on the old course from Gawthore Hall and grounds (F2); Pendle Hall (G1); Ightenhill Manor House (G2); and the Leeds and Liverpool Canal in Burnley (J1). The railway line through Padiham also appears.

Notable people

Bill Blackadder (1899–1977), professional footballer
William Blezard (1921–2003), composer born in Padiham, who worked with Joyce Grenfell and others
Thomas Birtwistle (1833–1912), trade unionist involved in Padiham weavers' strikes in 1859
Richard Bradshaw (fl. 1900s) footballer born in Padiham, played for Blackpool F.C.
Maurice Green (1906–1987), editor of The Financial Times and The Daily Telegraph, was born in Padiham.
Cyril Harrison (1901–1980), managing director of English Sewing Cotton Company, was educated at Padiham Wesleyan School.
Harry Hastie (fl. 1920), footballer
Gerardine Hemingway MBE (living), fashion designer, wife and partner of Wayne Hemingway
Harry Hill (1916–2009), born in Padiham, was a bronze medallist at the 1936 Summer Olympics in Berlin. Too poor to get to London any other way, Hill cycled the 200 miles from Sheffield on the bike he used in the Olympics.
Sir James Kay-Shuttleworth, 1st Baronet (1804–1877), husband of Janet Kay-Shuttleworth of Gawthorpe Hall, founded teacher training and independent school inspection in England and what is now the University of St Mark & St John.
Ughtred James Kay-Shuttleworth, 1st Baron Shuttleworth (1844–1939), Liberal politician, son of Sir James Kay-Shuttleworth. Under-Secretary of State for India and Chancellor of the Duchy of Lancaster under William Gladstone in 1886 and Parliamentary and Financial Secretary to the Admiralty under Gladstone and Lord Rosebery in 1892–1895. He inherited Gawthorpe on his mother's death in 1872.
Charles Kay-Shuttleworth, 5th Baron Shuttleworth (born 1948), Lord Lieutenant of Lancashire for 1997
John Pierce Chamberlain Starkie (1830–1888), landowner at Ashton Hall, Thurnham, Lancashire
Le Gendre Starkie (1799–1865) and Le Gendre Starkie (1828–1899), landowners at Huntroyde
Alfred Tysoe (1874–1901), Padiham-born athlete and winner of two gold medals in the 800m and 5,000m team races at the 1900 Olympic Games

Freedom of the Town
The following have received the Freedom of the Town of Padiham.

Individuals
Councillor Robert "Bob" Clark: 29 June 2021.

See also

Listed buildings in Padiham
History of Lancashire
The Brontë Way
Lancashire Cotton Corporation
Lancashire Cotton Famine
List of mills in Padiham
Burnley Corporation Tramways
List of schools in the Borough of Burnley
Leck Hall (current seat of Baron Shuttleworth, of Gawthorpe Hall)
Padiham F.C.

References
Notes

Citations

External links

Burnley Borough Council
Church of England Parish of Padiham and Hapton
Padiham Town Council
Visit Padiham
Padiham Urban District Council archive catalogue
Padiham Heritage Appraisal 2015

 
Towns in Lancashire
Districts in Burnley
Civil parishes in Lancashire
History of Lancashire